Edin Pehlić (born January 13, 1984 in Stolac, SR Bosnia and Herzegovina, SFR Yugoslavia) is a Bosnian-Herzegovinian footballer, who most recently played for Igman Konjic.

Club career
Pehlić has played for FK Sarajevo in the Premier League of Bosnia and Herzegovina and FBK Kaunas in the Lithuanian First Division. He joined in the spring of 2008 on loan to MTZ-RIPO Minsk of Belarus and returned in Winter 2009 to FBK Kaunas. On 6 January 2011 signed with his former club FK Sarajevo. After one year with Sarajevo, signed on 22 January 2012 for League rival Velez Mostar.

Personal life
Edin and his wife Aida have a son named Mak (born 2008).

References

External links
 
 

1984 births
Living people
People from Stolac
Association football midfielders
Bosnia and Herzegovina footballers
Bosnia and Herzegovina under-21 international footballers
FK Igman Konjic players
FK Sarajevo players
FBK Kaunas footballers
FC Partizan Minsk players
FK Velež Mostar players
Premier League of Bosnia and Herzegovina players
A Lyga players
Belarusian Premier League players
Bosnia and Herzegovina expatriate footballers
Expatriate footballers in Lithuania
Bosnia and Herzegovina expatriate sportspeople in Lithuania
Expatriate footballers in Belarus
Bosnia and Herzegovina expatriate sportspeople in Belarus